Tere Bin Laden: Dead or Alive is a 2016 Indian satire comedy film written and directed by Abhishek Sharma. A sequel to the 2010 film Tere Bin Laden, it narrates the story of an aspiring filmmaker who bumps into an Osama bin Laden look alike, and also samples materials from the prequel. The film stars Manish Paul, Pradhuman Singh Mall, and Piyush Mishra, and was released worldwide on 26 February 2016.

Plot
The story focuses on a director, Sharma, whose father owns a sweetshop and wants his son to work there. Sharma, however, wants to become a director, so he leaves for Mumbai to fulfill his dreams. While traveling in the bus, he meets Paddi Singh who notices that his face strongly resembles Osama Bin Ladin. With a new idea in mind, Singh takes him to the film producers Shetty Sisters, who offer opportunities for newcomers. After hearing Singh's idea, they're impressed, particularly upon seeing Paddi.

After the film Tere Bin Laden starring Ali Zafar becomes a blockbuster, Ali embarrasses both Sharma and Paddi. Sharma wants to make the sequel to the film, but Shetty Sisters decide not to help him as Ali wants the sequel to be produced by Karan Johar. This causes a fight between Ali and Sharma. Paddi intervenes and tells the Shetty Sisters that he will do the sequel on the condition it's produced by Sharma with Ali not as the lead actor. Shetty Sisters decide to fire Ali. Everyone involved has doubts and confusion on how can the film will perform without a renowned actor. Once shooting starts, a blunder happens; Osama dies. Thus, shooting stops as they lose confidence in the film. Shetty Sisters continuously demand their money be returned although Sharma has already spent it all. Meanwhile, USA president Obama, who has assassinated Osama, must prove the assassination to the people while lacking proof. They accidentally see Paddi on TV and concoct a plan to record video of his assassination as evidence. David DoSomething disguises himself as David Chadda, visits Paddi and offers him a role in a Hollywood film. Paddi, however, will only do the film on the condition Sharma directs it. Chadda agrees and tells them that the next day their driver will come pick them up.

Elsewhere, we are introduced to Khalili, owner of a terrorist organization and a business of selling guns and bombs. Due to financial crunches, the quality of the equipment is poor and causes his people to rebel. He amends the situation by promising free food and a film of Osama's adventures. During this film, a scene appears of Paddi and Khalili being informed that Osama is dead. Khalili plans to bring Paddi and have him reassure his people that he is the best supplier of bombing equipment and guns. He then orders his men to kidnap the cast of TBL. Their first target is Ali Zafar, but they fail to abduct him due to his "Six Pack Abs". Changing course, they set on kidnapping Paddi.

Khalili's men arrive before the driver sent by David picks them up. Sharma and Paddi, under the impression this was the driver sent by David, enters the car and is unknowingly kidnapped by Khalili's men.

When Chada learns of these circumstances, he travels to Khalili's place and rescues the cast of Tere bin Ladin. Chada now wants to capture a video portraying Osama (Paddi) being shot by the American army. When Sharma becomes aware of Chada's efforts, he makes a deal with him and Khalili. Chadda pays Khalili the money he's demanded while Sharma creates a "proof movie" in which Osama (Paddi) is shot by Obama. Obama then assures Sharma he can ask for any favors. Sharma says, "One Hollywood movie". In the end, that movie is shown to be Tora Bora Nights.

Cast
 Manish Paul as Sharma
 Pradhuman Singh Mall as Paddi Singh / Osama bin Laden
 Sikander Kher as David Chaddha / David DoSomething
 Mia Uyeda as Junior
 Piyush Mishra as Khalili
 Iman Crosson as Barack Obama
 Sugandha Garg
 Rahul Singh
 Chirag Vohra
 Ali Zafar as himself

Soundtrack
The soundtrack of the film was released by Zee Music Company.
"Six Pack Abs" by Ali Zafar
"Mara Gaya Hai" by Akshay Verma and Iman Crosson
"Itemwaale" by Ram Sampath (written by Munna Dhiman)

References

External links
 
 

2016 films
2010s Hindi-language films
2016 comedy films
Indian comedy films
Indian political satire films
Cultural depictions of Osama bin Laden
2010s satirical films
Hindi-language comedy films
Films about al-Qaeda
Films directed by Abhishek Sharma
Cultural depictions of Barack Obama
Films about Bollywood
Films about film directors and producers
Films about filmmaking
Films about films